Eric Cormack (18 February 1905 – 9 June 1988) was an  Australian rules footballer who played with St Kilda in the Victorian Football League (VFL).

Notes

External links 

1905 births
1988 deaths
Australian rules footballers from Victoria (Australia)
St Kilda Football Club players